Sander Branko van Gessel (born November 4, 1976 in Leidschendam, South Holland) is a Dutch footballer.

Career
He started his professional career in the 1995–1996 season playing for FC Groningen. He later served SC Heerenveen, NAC Breda and Sparta Rotterdam.

In summer 2010 he was signed by FC Edmonton in preparation for the club's competitive debut in the 2011 North American Soccer League season. However, van Gessel exercised a contract clause and left Edmonton on January 17, 2011 when JEF United Chiba of J2 League made a more lucrative offer.

References

External links

  Profile

1976 births
Living people
Dutch footballers
Dutch expatriate footballers
Eredivisie players
Eerste Divisie players
J2 League players
SC Heerenveen players
JEF United Chiba players
Association football defenders
FC Groningen players
Dutch expatriate sportspeople in Canada
Dutch expatriate sportspeople in Japan
NAC Breda players
Expatriate soccer players in Canada
Expatriate footballers in Japan
Sparta Rotterdam players
People from Leidschendam
Footballers from South Holland